Tom Schultz may refer to:
 Tom Schultz (soccer)
 Tom Schultz (Canadian football)

See also
 Tom Scholz, American musician